Martin Limón is an American writer of mystery fiction. He is the author of fourteen books in the Sueño and Bascom series, including Jade Lady Burning and the short story collection Nightmare Range, inspired by his time in Korea.

Biography
Limón retired from military service after twenty years in the United States Army, including ten years in South Korea in five tours starting 1968. Similar to his main character Sueño, Limón extensively studied Korean language, taking night classes at the University of Maryland Far East Division alongside civilian workers and foreign spouses during his time in Korea and claiming he earned the most credits in the Korean language for a U.S. soldier at the time. Unlike Sueño, he was never a CID officer and calls his career  "exceedingly undistinguished," working in many odd jobs, writing for Stars and Stripes, serving as an artillery gun crew chief, working in military intelligence, managing an NCO club and even earning extra money by learning card counting. He lives near Seattle.

Bibliography

The Sueño and Bascom Novels

Jade Lady Burning (1992) 
Slicky Boys (1997) 
Buddha's Money (1998) 
The Door to Bitterness (2005) 
The Wandering Ghost (2007) 
G.I. Bones (2009) 
Mr. Kill (2011) 
The Joy Brigade (2012) 
The Iron Sickle (2014) 
The Ville Rat (2015) 
Ping-Pong Heart (2016) 
The Nine-Tailed Fox (2017) 
The Line (October 2018) 
GI Confidential (October 2019) 
War Women (November 2021)

References

External links
Author's homepage at Soho Press

American mystery writers
American crime fiction writers
21st-century American novelists
1948 births
Living people
21st-century American male writers